In mathematics, the Dedekind zeta function of an algebraic number field K, generally denoted ζK(s), is a generalization of the Riemann zeta function (which is obtained in the case where K is the field of rational numbers Q). It can be defined as a Dirichlet series, it has an Euler product expansion, it satisfies a functional equation, it has an analytic continuation to a meromorphic function on the complex plane C with only a simple pole at s = 1, and its values encode arithmetic data of K. The extended Riemann hypothesis states that if ζK(s) = 0 and 0 < Re(s) < 1, then Re(s) = 1/2.

The Dedekind zeta function is named for Richard Dedekind who introduced it in his supplement to Peter Gustav Lejeune Dirichlet's Vorlesungen über Zahlentheorie.

Definition and basic properties
Let K be an algebraic number field. Its Dedekind zeta function is first defined for complex numbers s with real part Re(s) > 1 by the Dirichlet series

where I ranges through the non-zero ideals of the ring of integers OK of K and NK/Q(I) denotes the absolute norm of I (which is equal to both the index [OK : I] of I in OK or equivalently the cardinality of quotient ring OK / I). This sum converges absolutely for all complex numbers s with real part Re(s) > 1. In the case K = Q, this definition reduces to that of the Riemann zeta function.

Euler product
The Dedekind zeta function of  has an Euler product which is a product over all the prime ideals  of 

For  is non-zero.

Analytic continuation and functional equation
Erich Hecke first proved that ζK(s) has an analytic continuation to the complex plane as a meromorphic function, having a simple pole only at s = 1. The residue at that pole is given by the analytic class number formula and is made up of important arithmetic data involving invariants of the unit group and class group of K.

The Dedekind zeta function satisfies a functional equation relating its values at s and 1 − s. Specifically, let ΔK denote the discriminant of K, let r1 (resp. r2) denote the number of real places (resp. complex places) of K, and let

and

where Γ(s) is the Gamma function. Then, the functions

satisfy the functional equation

Special values
Analogously to the Riemann zeta function, the values of the Dedekind zeta function at integers encode (at least conjecturally) important arithmetic data of the field K. For example, the analytic class number formula relates the residue at s = 1 to the class number h(K) of K, the regulator R(K) of K, the number w(K) of roots of unity in K, the absolute discriminant of K, and the number of real and complex places of K. Another example is at s = 0 where it has a zero whose order r is equal to the rank of the unit group of OK and the leading term is given by

It follows from the functional equation that .
Combining the functional equation and the fact that Γ(s) is infinite at all integers less than or equal to zero yields that ζK(s) vanishes at all negative even integers. It even vanishes at all negative odd integers unless K is totally real (i.e. r2 = 0; e.g. Q or a real quadratic field). In the totally real case, Carl Ludwig Siegel showed that ζK(s) is a non-zero rational number at negative odd integers. Stephen Lichtenbaum conjectured specific values for these rational numbers in terms of the algebraic K-theory of K.

Relations to other L-functions
For the case in which K is an abelian extension of Q, its Dedekind zeta function can be written as a product of Dirichlet L-functions. For example, when K is a quadratic field this shows that the ratio

is the L-function L(s, χ), where χ is a Jacobi symbol used as Dirichlet character. That the zeta function of a quadratic field is a product of the Riemann zeta function and a certain Dirichlet L-function is an analytic formulation of the quadratic reciprocity law of Gauss.

In general, if K is a Galois extension of Q with Galois group G, its Dedekind zeta function is the Artin L-function of the regular representation of G and hence has a factorization in terms of Artin L-functions of irreducible Artin representations of G.

The relation with Artin L-functions shows that if L/K is a Galois extension then  is holomorphic ( "divides" ): for general extensions the result would follow from the Artin conjecture for L-functions.

Additionally, ζK(s) is the Hasse–Weil zeta function of Spec OK and the motivic L-function of the motive coming from the cohomology of Spec K.

Arithmetically equivalent fields

Two fields are called arithmetically equivalent if they have the same Dedekind zeta function.  used Gassmann triples to give some examples of pairs of non-isomorphic fields that are arithmetically equivalent. In particular some of these pairs have different class numbers, so the Dedekind zeta function of a number field does not determine its class number.

 showed that two number fields K and L are arithmetically equivalent if and only if all but finitely many prime numbers p have the same inertia degrees in the two fields, i.e., if  are the prime ideals in K lying over p, then  the tuples  need to be the same for K and for L for almost all p.

Notes

References

Section 10.5.1 of 

Zeta and L-functions
Algebraic number theory